The Director General of the European Space Agency is the highest-ranked official of the European Space Agency (ESA), a space agency formed by the collaboration of prominent European nations.

ELDO Secretaries General

ESRO Directors General

ESA Director General

See also 
 Administrator of the National Aeronautics and Space Administration
 Chairman of the Indian Space Research Organization

References

External links 
 
 
 

European Space Agency